Faist may refer to:

 Chinese ritual mastery traditions, sometimes rendered as "Faism"
 FAIST Anlagenbau GmbH, manufacturer of noise control facilities and aero-acoustic wind tunnel treatment.
 Faist, a British manufacturer of electro-mechanical systems and components